Judge Gideon Frisbee House is a historic home located at Delhi in Delaware County, New York, United States. It was built about 1798 and consists of a 2-story, clapboarded, rectangular-frame main section with a -story rear wing.  The house is in the Federal style.  It serves as headquarters of the Delaware County Historical Association.

It was listed on the National Register of Historic Places in 1976.

See also
National Register of Historic Places listings in Delaware County, New York

References

External links
Delaware County Historical Association website

Houses on the National Register of Historic Places in New York (state)
National Register of Historic Places in Delaware County, New York
Federal architecture in New York (state)
Houses completed in 1798
Houses in Delaware County, New York
Museums in Delaware County, New York
Historic house museums in New York (state)
Historical society museums in New York (state)